= Sennott Park =

Park in Cambridge, Massachusetts, United States

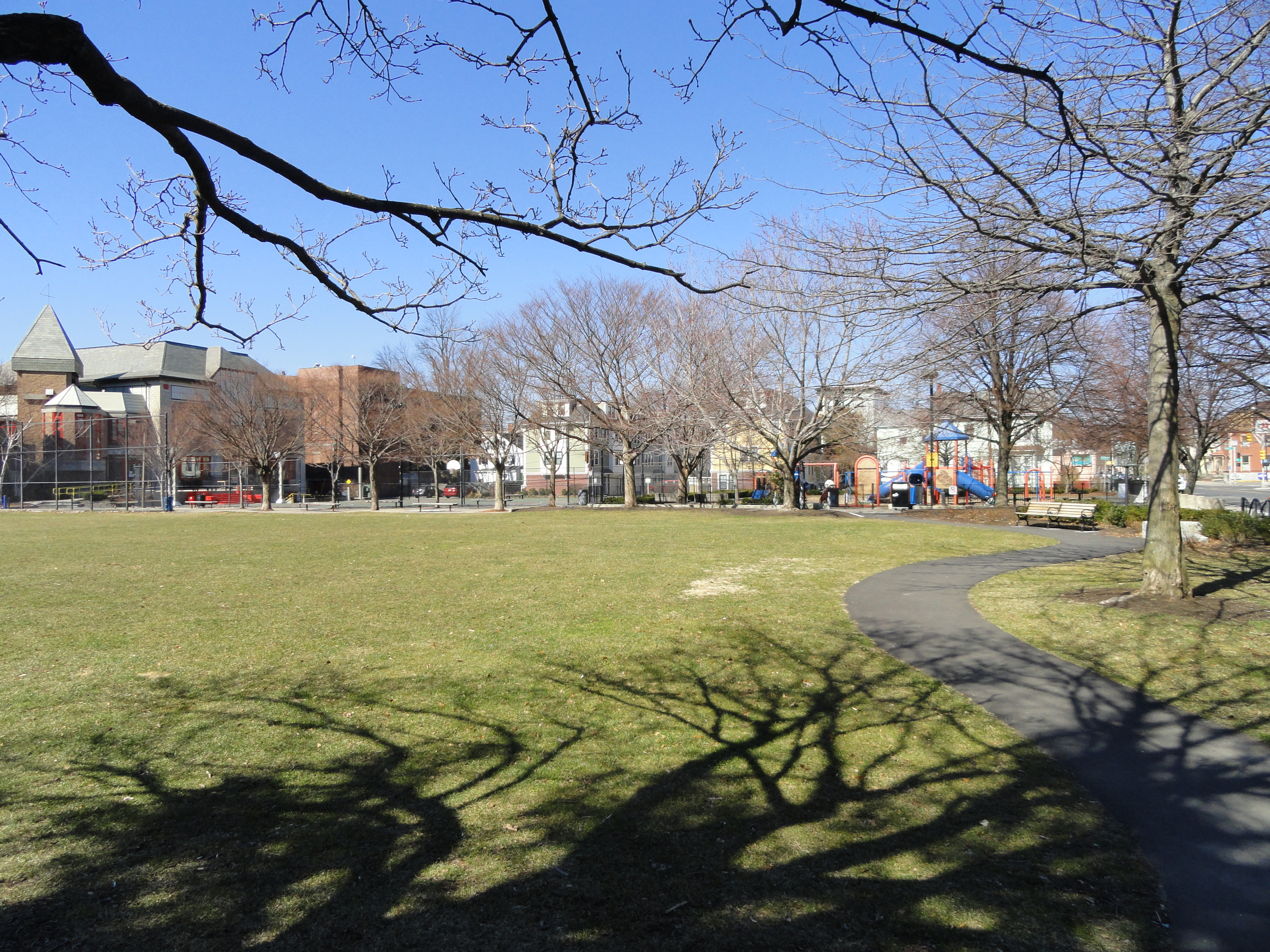
- The park in 2011

- Location within Massachusetts
- Type: Park
- Location: Broadway and Norfolk Street
- Nearest city: Cambridge, Massachusetts
- Coordinates: 42.3684°N 71.1°W

Sennott Park is a park at the intersection of Broadway and Norfolk Street in Cambridge, Massachusetts, United States.

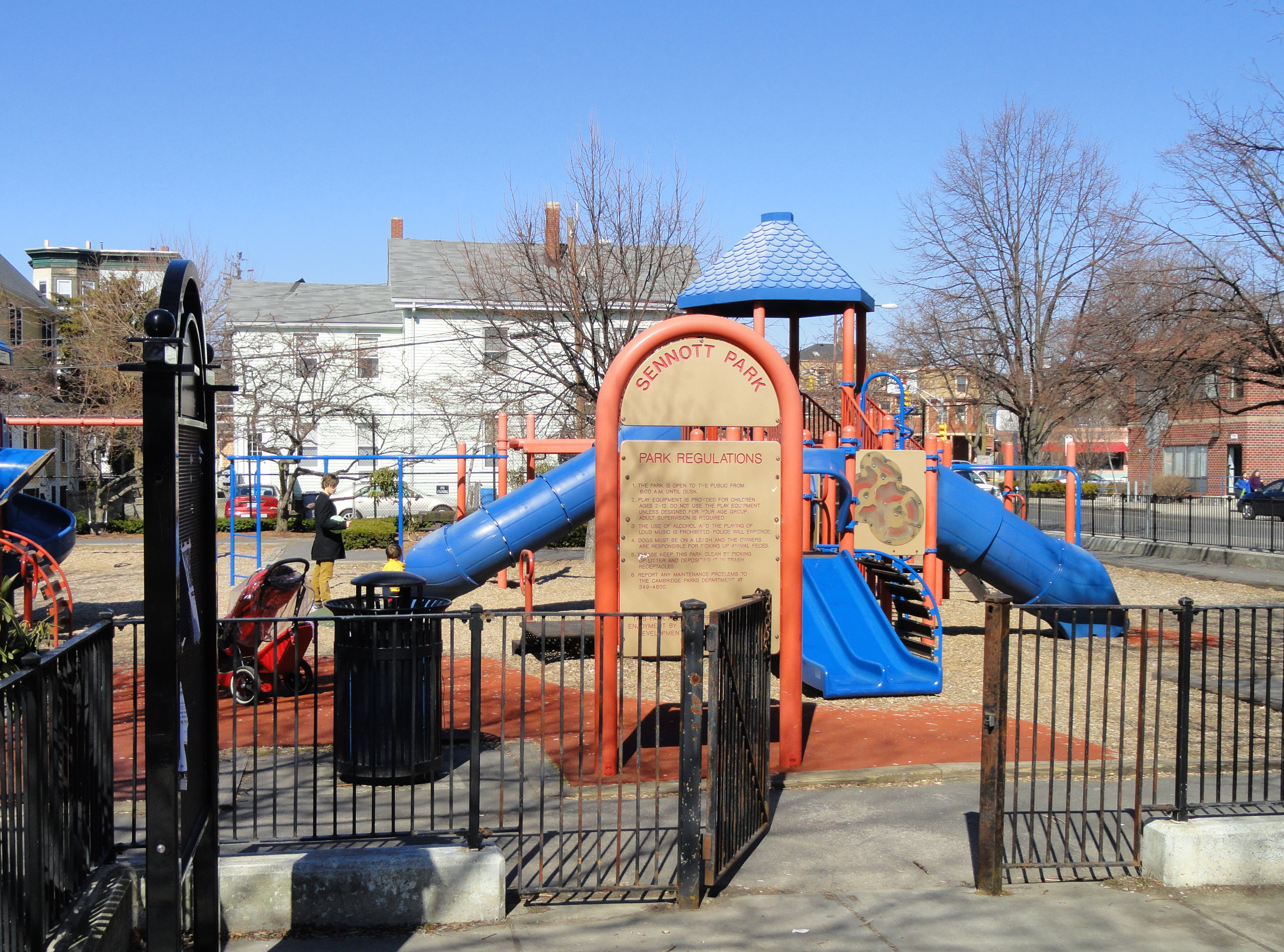
Playground

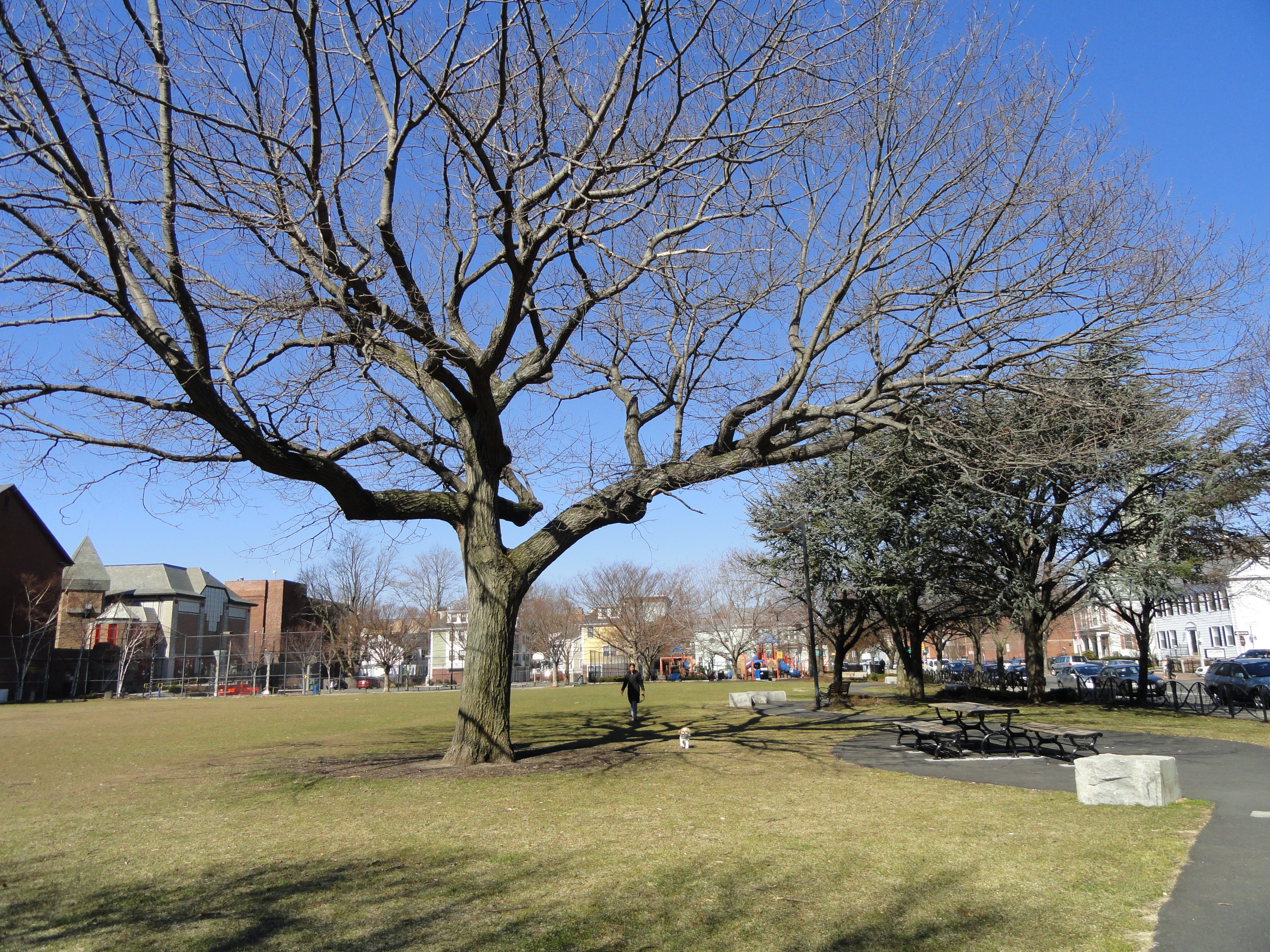
The park in 2011
